183 (one hundred [and] eighty-three) is the natural number following 182 and preceding 184.

In mathematics
183 is a perfect totient number, a number that is equal to the sum of its iterated totients

Because , it is the number of points in a projective plane over the finite field . 183 is the fourth element of a divisibility sequence  in which the th number  can be computed as

for a transcendental number . This sequence counts the number of trees of height  in which each node can have at most two children.

There are 183 different semiorders on four labeled elements.

See also
 The year AD 183 or 183 BC
 List of highways numbered 183

References

Integers
183